Georgetown College may refer to:
Georgetown College (Georgetown University), a college within Georgetown University in Washington, DC.
Georgetown College (Kentucky), a private liberal arts college in Kentucky.